According to the Guinness World Records, the world's largest weather vane is located in Jerez, Spain.

According to the explore north website  a challenger for the title of world's largest weather vane is located in Whitehorse, Yukon. The weather vane is a retired Douglas DC-3 atop a swiveling support. Located beside the Whitehorse airport the weather vane is used mainly by pilots to determine wind direction. This weather vane only requires a 5 km/hour wind to rotate.

Other claimants to the title are located in:

Westlock, Alberta, Canada: The Canadian Tractor Museum is home to the tallest functioning weather vane at 50 feet.  This weather vane was erected in 2006 with a 1942 Case Model D Tractor atop it after being a volunteer project for 2 years.  

 Montague, Michigan, USA: Montague is home to the "World's Largest Working Weathervane" which was constructed in part by local manufacturer Whitehall Metal Studios. Originally located on a man-made peninsula that jutted out into the waters at the Northeast end of White Lake, it was moved to the corner of Dowling & Water Streets in Montague. The functioning weathervane is 48 feet tall with an arrow 26 feet long. It is topped by the Ella Ellenwood, a lumbering Schooner that frequented White Lake transporting lumber from Montague to Milwaukee, Wisconsin.

References 

Meteorological instrumentation and equipment